Kristin Mann (born September 12, 1946) is an American historian and author renowned for her works on the history of slavery in Africa. in 2002, she was awarded the Guggenheim Fellowships award. She is currently a Professor of History at Emory University in Druid Hills, Georgia, United States.

Selected works

References

Bibliography

External links
Profile on Emory University

American women historians
Living people
Place of birth missing (living people)
Emory University faculty
Stanford University alumni
Historians of Nigeria
1946 births
21st-century American women